Wages of War is a video game developed by American studio Random Games and published by New World Computing and 3DO for Windows.

Gameplay
Wages of War is a turn-based combat game at squad-level, in which players send mercenaries on dangerous missions.

Reception
Next Generation reviewed the arcade version of the game, rating it two stars out of five, and stated that "Wages of War has its moments, but overall it is an average title that adds little but a Windows 95 interface to the genre of turn-based, squad-level combat."

Reviews
Computer Gaming World #153 (Apr 1997)
GameSpot - Dec 19, 1996
Pelit - Feb, 1997
PC Player (Germany) - Dec, 1996

References

1996 video games
New World Computing
Turn-based strategy video games
Video games developed in the United States
Windows games
Windows-only games